Victoria Tolosa Paz (born 24 June 1973) is an Argentine politician and public accountant. Since 2022, she has been Minister of Social Development in the cabinet of President Alberto Fernández. 

Previously, she was a National Deputy elected in Buenos Aires Province from 2021 to 2022, president of the National Council for the Coordination of Social Policies from 2020 to 2021, and member of the City Council of La Plata from 2017 to 2021.

Early life and education
Tolosa Paz was born on 24 June 1973 in La Plata, into a middle-class family politically aligned with the Radical Civic Union. Her mother, Laura Figliozzi, was an employee at the Electoral Secretariat of La Plata's Federal Tribunal N. 1, while her father, Juan Honorio Tolosa Paz, is a researcher and astrologer. Tolosa Paz studied public accounting at the Universidad Católica de La Plata.

Political career
In 2002, during the government of Eduardo Duhalde, she became an advisor to the Coordination area of the Minister Unit of the Ministry of Social Development.

In 2003, she was the Regional Head of the Participatory Social Investment Fund (FOPAR), a World Bank programme.

In the 2017 elections, Tolosa Paz was elected to the La Plata Partido City Council as the first candidate in the Unidad Ciudadana list; she has served in the position ad honorem, She forms part of the Frente de Todos bloc. She sought the Frente de Todos candidacy to the mayoralty of La Plata in the 2019 elections, but lost in the P.A.S.O. primaries against Florencia Saintout.

On 10 December 2019, she was appointed by President Alberto Fernández as Executive Secretary of the National Council for the Coordination of Social Policies. Later, on 17 July 2020, she was appointed president of the council. She resigned from her position and from her seat in the La Plata City Council on 25 August 2021, ahead of the 2021 legislative election, in preparation for her candidacy to the Chamber of Deputies in the Frente de Todos party list in Buenos Aires Province.

On 10 October 2022, it was announced Juan Zabaleta would resign from his position as Minister of Social Development. President Alberto Fernández then designated Tolosa Paz to the post, and she assumed office on 13 October 2022. It was one of three cabinet appointments made that day, alongside Ayelén Mazzina (to the Ministry of Women) and Kelly Olmos (to the Ministry of Labour). Her seat in the Chamber of Deputies was then assumed by Micaela Morán.

Personal life
Tolosa Paz has been married twice, and has three children from her first marriage. Since 2012, she has been married to media businessman and former Media Secretary Enrique "Pepe" Albistur.

Electoral history

References

External links

1973 births
Living people
People from La Plata
Buenos Aires Province politicians
21st-century Argentine women politicians
Justicialist Party politicians
21st-century Argentine politicians
Members of the Argentine Chamber of Deputies elected in Buenos Aires Province
Ministers of social welfare of Argentina
Women members of the Argentine Chamber of Deputies
Women government ministers of Argentina